Vase life is the period during which a cut flower or cut foliage retains its appearance in a vase. This is a major consideration in identifying plant species suitable for use in floristry, plants with a long vase life being far more desirable than those with a short vase life. Chemical treatments that extend vase life are a major component of floriculture research.

References 
Floristry